The 1982–83 Cypriot Second Division was the 28th season of the Cypriot second-level football league. Ermis Aradippou FC won their 1st title.

Format
Fourteen teams participated in the 1982–83 Cypriot Second Division. All teams played against each other twice, once at their home and once away. The team with the most points at the end of the season crowned champions. The first two teams were promoted to 1983–84 Cypriot First Division. The last two teams were relegated to the 1983–84 Cypriot Third Division.

Changes from previous season
Teams promoted to 1982–83 Cypriot First Division
 Alki Larnaca FC
 Aris Limassol FC

Teams relegated from 1981–82 Cypriot First Division
 Keravnos Strovolou FC
 Evagoras Paphos

Teams promoted from 1981–82 Cypriot Third Division
 Digenis Akritas Ipsona
 Anagennisi Deryneia FC

Teams relegated to 1982–83 Cypriot Third Division
 Akritas Chlorakas
 Digenis Akritas Morphou FC

League standings

See also
 Cypriot Second Division
 1982–83 Cypriot First Division
 1982–83 Cypriot Cup

References

Cypriot Second Division seasons
Cyprus
1982–83 in Cypriot football